Sadki is a rural locality (a selo) in Loznovskoye Rural Settlement, Dubovsky District, Volgograd Oblast, Russia. The population was 303 as of 2010. There are 10 streets.

Geography 
Sadki is located 34 km from Volga River, 49 km northwest of Dubovka (the district's administrative centre) by road. Spartak is the nearest rural locality.

References 

Rural localities in Dubovsky District, Volgograd Oblast